Lary J. Swoboda, Ph.D. (May 28, 1939November 25, 2012) was an American educator and Democratic politician.  He served 24 years in the Wisconsin State Assembly, representing Door and Kewaunee counties.

Biography
Swoboda was born in Luxemburg, Wisconsin, in 1939. A Roman Catholic, he  was a member of the Society of the Holy Name and the Knights of Columbus. He received his bachelor's and master's degrees from University of Wisconsin–Milwaukee and became a schoolteacher in the Southern Door School system.

Family
Swoboda was born to Joseph and Catherine (née Daul) Swoboda. On November 16, 1968, he married Janice M. Hendricks in Green Bay.

Political career
Swoboda was a Democratic member of the Assembly from 1971 to his retirement in 1994 (at which time he was the longest-serving member of the Assembly). After leaving public office, Swoboda was state director of Americorps. He received his doctorate and became a school administrator. In 2000, he sought election to the Wisconsin State Assembly and was defeated.

Death
Lary Swoboda died on November 25, 2012, aged 73, from a heart attack.

References

External links
The Political Graveyard

1939 births
2012 deaths
Catholics from Wisconsin
Schoolteachers from Wisconsin
People from Luxemburg, Wisconsin
University of Wisconsin–Milwaukee alumni
Democratic Party members of the Wisconsin State Assembly